Blue Arrow is a United Kingdom-based employment and recruitment agency.

Blue Arrow or Blue Arrows may also refer to:

 China Railways DJJ1 "Blue Arrow", a Chinese push-pull train
 Re Blue Arrow plc, a United Kingdom company law case dealing with unfair prejudice
 Flechas Azules Division (Blue Arrows), a Spanish division during the Spanish Civil War
 Flechas Azules Mixed Brigade (Blue Arrows), a mixed Italo-Spanish brigade during the Spanish Civil War
 Blue arrow, a waymarking symbol denoting bridleways on Esk Valley Walk in North Yorkshire, England

See also
 Arrow in the Blue, the title of the Arthur Koestler autobiography
 Arrow (disambiguation)
 Black Arrow (disambiguation)
 Golden Arrow (disambiguation)
 Green Arrow (disambiguation)
 Pink Arrow (disambiguation)
 Red Arrow (disambiguation)
 Silver Arrow (disambiguation)
 White Arrow (disambiguation)
 Yellow Arrow (disambiguation)